The 1939–40 SK Rapid Wien season was the 42nd season in club history.

Squad

Squad and statistics

Squad statistics

Fixtures and results

Gauliga

German championship

Tschammerpokal

References

1939-40 Rapid Wien Season
Rapid